The 1941–42 NHL season was the 25th season of the National Hockey League. Seven teams played 48 games each. The Toronto Maple Leafs would win the Stanley Cup defeating the Detroit Red Wings winning four straight after losing the first three in a best-of-seven series, a feat only repeated three times in NHL history (1975, 2010, 2014) and once in Major League Baseball (2004) as of 2021.

League business
This season was the last season for the Brooklyn Americans who had changed their name from the New York Americans in an attempt to build a civic relationship with those from the Flatbush area of New York.

Due to World War II travel restrictions on adults, the NHL demanded more junior-aged players who were free of the travel restrictions. NHL president Frank Calder reported there was a general agreement with the amateur leagues that a junior-aged player should be able to determine his own financial future due to the war.

Regular season
The Americans started the season without Harvey "Busher" Jackson who refused to sign. He was then sold to Boston. But the Amerks had two positive notes: two defencemen, Tommy Anderson and Pat Egan, were now All-Star calibre. That did not prevent them from finishing last, though. On December 9, 1941, the Chicago Black Hawks-Boston Bruins game would be delayed for over a half-hour as United States President Franklin Delano Roosevelt declared that the United States was at war.

Frank Patrick suffered a heart attack and had to sell his interest in the Montreal Canadiens, and the Habs almost had to move to Cleveland. But Tommy Gorman kept the team alive. They added Emile "Butch" Bouchard to start his great career on defence and another very good player, Buddy O'Connor, at centre. Montreal had goaltending problems as Bert Gardiner slumped, and rookie Paul Bibeault replaced him. He showed flashes of brilliance, but his inexperience showed. Joe Benoit starred with 20 goals, the first Canadien to do that since 1938–39, when Toe Blake did it.

The New York Rangers had a new goaltender as Sugar Jim Henry replaced the retired Dave Kerr. Henry was one of the reasons the Rangers finished first, something they would not again do for the next 50 years.

Final standings

Playoffs

Playoff bracket

Quarterfinals

(3) Boston Bruins vs. (4) Chicago Black Hawks

(5) Detroit Red Wings vs. (6) Montreal Canadiens

Semifinals

(1) New York Rangers vs. (2) Toronto Maple Leafs

(3) Boston Bruins vs. (5) Detroit Red Wings

Stanley Cup finals

Awards

Player statistics

Scoring leaders
Note: GP = Games played, G = Goals, A = Assists, PTS = Points, PIM = Penalties in minutes

Source: NHL

Leading goaltenders

Note: GP = Games played; Mins – Minutes Played; GA = Goals against; GAA = Goals against average; W = Wins; L = Losses; T = Ties; SO = Shutouts

Coaches
Boston Bruins: Art Ross
Brooklyn Americans: Art Chapman
Chicago Black Hawks: Paul Thompson
Detroit Red Wings: Jack Adams
Montreal Canadiens: Dick Irvin
New York Rangers: Frank Boucher
Toronto Maple Leafs: Hap Day

Debuts
The following is a list of players of note who played their first NHL game in 1941–42 (listed with their first team, asterisk(*) marks debut in playoffs):
Kenny Mosdell, Brooklyn Americans
Harry Watson, Brooklyn Americans
Bill Mosienko, Chicago Black Hawks
Adam Brown, Detroit Red Wings
Buddy O'Connor, Montreal Canadiens
James Haggarty, Montreal Canadiens
Emile "Butch" Bouchard, Montreal Canadiens
Grant Warwick, New York Rangers
Jim Henry, New York Rangers
Bob Goldham, Toronto Maple Leafs
Gaye Stewart*, Toronto Maple Leafs

Last games
The following is a list of players of note that played their last game in the NHL in 1941–42 (listed with their last team):
Eddie Wiseman, Boston Bruins
Tommy Anderson, Brooklyn Americans
Art Coulter, New York Rangers
Pete Langelle, Toronto Maple Leafs

See also 
 1941-42 NHL transactions
 List of Stanley Cup champions
 1941 in sports
 1942 in sports

References 
 
 
 
 
 

Notes

External links
 Hockey Database
 NHL.com

 
1941–42 in Canadian ice hockey by league
1941–42 in American ice hockey by league